Gal Costa is the first solo album by the Brazilian singer Gal Costa, released in 1969. It was ranked the 80th best Brazilian album of all time by the Brazilian Rolling Stone magazine.

Considered one of the most representative records of the countercultural Tropicália movement, the album features songwriting by various artist associated with the movement, with whom Costa had previously worked with in the 1968 collaboration album Tropicália: ou Panis et Circencis. These include Caetano Veloso, Gilberto Gil and Torquato Neto.

Composition
The music in the album has been considered unprecedented.  It represents a strong departure from the style of Domingo, her debut album recorded with Caetano Veloso, which featured a "set of airy, somewhat standard bossa nova tunes". Writing for Brazilian edition of Rolling Stone, Marcus Petro considered that, despite incorporating new influences from Janis Joplin and James Brown, Costa's music still retained strong bossa nova elements. The sound of Gal Costa has been called "truly psychedelic and very much of its time, but also full of subtlety, as befits the melodic complexity and harmonic freedom" of its songs.

Track listing

References 

1969 albums
Gal Costa albums
Portuguese-language albums